Kinassery may refer to:
 Kinassery, Kozhikode
 Kinassery, Palakkad
 Kinassery, Thrissur